The Sonny Side of Stitt is an  album by saxophonist Sonny Stitt recorded in 1959 and originally released on the Roost label.

Reception
The Allmusic site awarded the album 3 stars.

Track listing 
All compositions by Sonny Stitt except as indicated
 "Skylark" (Hoagy Carmichael, Johnny Mercer) - 2:50  
 "Don't Worry 'bout Me" (Rube Bloom, Ted Koehler) - 2:55  
 "I'll Remember April" (Gene de Paul,  Patricia Johnston, Don Raye) - 3:46  
 "Day by Day" (Axel Stordahl, Paul Weston, Sammy Cahn) - 3:34  
 "Red Top" (Lionel Hampton) - 3:55  
 "Moonray" (Artie Shaw, Paul Madison, Arthur Quinser) - 3:01  
 "Old Fashioned Blues" - 4:47  
 "I Never Knew" (Earl Carroll) - 4:31  
 "Hitsburg" - 4:27

Personnel 
Sonny Stitt - alto saxophone, tenor saxophone 5,8,9
Jimmy Jones - piano
Aaron Bell - bass
Roy Haynes - drums

References 

1960 albums
Roost Records albums
Sonny Stitt albums
Albums produced by Teddy Reig